Photuris may refer to:
Photuris (genus), a genus of beetles containing several species of firefly
Photuris (protocol), a computer networking session key management protocol